Reijo Kanerva (29 January 1944 – 1 March 2016) was a Finnish footballer. He played in 15 matches for the Finland national football team from 1964 to 1967.

References

1944 births
2016 deaths
Finnish footballers
Finland international footballers
Place of birth missing
Association footballers not categorized by position